Pawns in the Game is the only studio album by the American musician Professor Griff and the Last Asiatic Disciples, which included Life (Sean Peacock), Patrick X (Sean Smith), B-Wyze (Robert L. Harding, Jr.), Jim "Obie" O'Brien (John Michael O'Brian), and JXL (Jason Wicks). It was released in 1990 via Luke/Atlantic Records. The recording sessions took place at Skyywalker Recording Studio in Liberty City. The production was mainly handled by Griff, with co-producers O'Brien, Beatmaster Clay D (Clay Dixon) and Kerwin "Sleek" Young. Luke Skyywalker served as the executive producer.

The album peaked at number 127 on the Billboard 200 and number 24 on the Top R&B/Hip-Hop Albums chart. The title track and "The Verdict" were the only singles released. "Pawns in the Game" entered the Billboard rap singles chart at number 4.

Due to comments made by Griff prior to the album's recording, Pawns in the Game was not carried by every national record chain.

Critical reception
The Chicago Tribune wrote that "although the music is good, and Griff and his crew are proficient rappers, Pawns in the Game is missing the urgency and spunk that fuel Public Enemy`s recordings." MusicHound Rock: The Essential Album Guide called the album "morally irritating." Trouser Press wrote that "although its strong rhythm tracks are gripping enough, the baldly proselytic Pawns in the Game isn’t about entertainment." The Rolling Stone Album Guide wrote that there are "enough hard beats built into the backing tracks to cover for Griff's sometimes shaky delivery."

Track listing

Charts

References

External links

1990 debut albums
Luke Records albums
Professor Griff albums